Mohamed Sayari (born January 31, 1957 in Béja) is a Tunisian actor and theatre director. He's famous for notable movies, TV series and plays.

Art Works

Movies 

 1989 : La Barbare de Mireille Darc
 1992 : Le Sultan de la médina of Moncef Dhouib
 2008 : Bab Al Samah of Francesco Sperandeo
 2011 : Or noir of Jean-Jacques Annaud
 2013 : Late Spring of Zachary Kerschberg
 2013 : Nesma of Homeïda Behi

Television 

 1974 : Affaires
 1982 : La Nouvelle Malle des Indes of Christian-Jaque
 1983 : Secret diplomatique of Denys de La Patellière
 1983 : La Nuit tunisienne
 1996 : Ghada of Mohamed Hadj Slimane
 1997 : Al Motahadi of Moncef Kateb
 2011 : L'ombra del destino of Pier Belloni
 2012 : Min Ajel Ouyoun Catherine of Hamadi Arafa
 2012 : La Fuite de Carthage of Madih Belaïd (television documentary film)
 2013 : Njoum Ellil (season 4) of Madih Belaïd
 2014 : Maktoub (season 4) of Sami Fehri 
 2015 : Awled Moufida of Sami Fehri 
 2015 : Le Risque

Theatre 

 2003 : Mourad III, written by Habib Boularès and directed by Mohamed Driss
 2013 : Hamlet
 2015 : Dhalamouni habaybi of Abdelaziz Meherzi
 Connais ton pays
 Le Juge des juges
 Ibrahim II
 Rose en or 
 Une Femme au bain maure des hommes
 Ellyl zéhi of Farhat Jedid

References

1957 births
Tunisian male film actors
Living people
Tunisian male stage actors
Tunisian theatre directors
People from Béja
Tunisian male television actors
21st-century Tunisian male actors